The Samsung Galaxy Ace 4 is a smartphone manufactured by Samsung that runs the Android operating system. Announced in June and released by Samsung in August 2014, the Galaxy Ace 4 is the successor to the Galaxy Ace 3. An LTE model was also announced in 2014.

Features

The device is slightly thicker than its predecessor at 10.8 mm. The Galaxy Ace 4 is slightly heavier than the Ace 3 at 123.8 grams. The phone is available in black, grey and white.

The Galaxy Ace 4 is a 4G smartphone with GSM/HSPA network. It has 4.0 inch capacitive touchscreen with 16M colours WVGA (480x800) resolution. It has a 5-megapixel camera with LED flash and auto focus, Geo-tagging, face/smile detection, panorama. Capable of recording videos at 720p@30fps), VGA. The Galaxy Ace 4 comes with a 1500 mAh Li-Ion battery.

Other specifications remain identical: 1 GB of memory, 8 GB of storage, a micro USB 2.0 port at the bottom and a combined stereo jack at the top. Access to the micro SIM slot and the micro SD slot is possible after removing the back cover.

Comparison table

See also
 Samsung Galaxy Ace
 Samsung Galaxy Ace 3
 Samsung Galaxy Pocket 2
 Samsung Galaxy Trend 2 Lite (SM-G318H/HZ)

References 

Samsung mobile phones
Samsung Galaxy
Android (operating system) devices
Mobile phones introduced in 2014
Mobile phones with user-replaceable battery